"Raised by a Good Time" is a song co-written and recorded by Canadian country music singer Steven Lee Olsen. It was released to digital retailers on November 10, 2014 through Sony Music Entertainment and Columbia Nashville as the lead single for his forthcoming debut studio album. The song serves as Olsen's major-label debut as well as his first release in the American country market. It reached the top 5 on the Canada Country chart and was certified Gold by Music Canada.

Background
After a decade of songwriting in Nashville and releasing music on an indie label (RKG) in Canada since 2009, Olsen signed a record deal with Columbia Nashville and began working on his debut studio album. Around the same time, one of his songs ("Cold Like That") was recorded by popular country music singer Garth Brooks for his 2014 "comeback" album, Man Against Machine. "Raised by a Good Time" is the first release from these recordings.

Described by critics as "autobiographical," the song is influenced by the writers' personal experiences with teenage misbehavior. Writing for the song developed out of a conversation between the three (Olsen, Chris Stevens, and Cary Barlowe) about the "stupid things we did" in their youth, according to Olsen, "[about] how much fun we had and just hell we raised."

Commercial performance
"Raised by a Good Time" entered the Billboard Canadian Hot 100 at number 84 on the chart dated January 24, 2015. The song reached its peak position of 58 in its tenth week, on the chart dated March 28, 2015. It also debuted at number 43 on the Canada Country airplay chart dated December 27, 2014 and reached a peak position of 3 on the chart dated March 28, 2015. "Raised by a Good Time" was certified Gold by Music Canada in August 2015, indicating digital sales of over 40,000 copies.

In the US, "Raised by a Good Time" was the most-added song on country radio the week of its release (December 1, 2014). The song debuted at number 59 on the Billboard Country Airplay chart dated December 27, 2014. It peaked two positions higher, at number 57, on the chart dated January 17, 2015.

Music video
The accompanying music video for "Raised by a Good Time" was directed by Mason Dixon and premiered March 19, 2015 through Rolling Stone. It contains performance footage of Olsen and his backing band as well as scenes depicting "the recklessness of teen rebellion," including sneaking out of the house, flirting with strangers, and bonfires.

Charts and certifications

Weekly charts

Certifications

Release history

References

2014 songs
2014 singles
Steven Lee Olsen songs
Sony Music singles
Columbia Nashville Records singles
Songs written by Cary Barlowe
Columbia Records singles
Songs written by Steven Lee Olsen